The 1956 NCAA College Division football season saw the NCAA split member schools into two divisions: larger schools were part of the University Division, later known as NCAA Division I, and smaller schools were placed in the College Division, later split into NCAA Division II and NCAA Division III.

Champions

Black college championship
The  Tennessee A&I (9–0) and the Florida A&M Rattlers (8–0) were considered to be the No. 1 and No. 2 teams "among the nation's Negro grid powers".  The teams from the two historically black universities played at the Orange Bowl stadium in Miami, which hosted the Orange Blossom Classic as well as the New Year's Day, historically white universities, Orange Bowl game.  A crowd of 41,808 watched Tennessee A&I win 41–39.

Conference champions

Conference standings

Postseason

Burley Bowl

The Memphis State Tigers faced off against the East Tennessee State Buccaneers in the Burley Bowl in Johnson City, Tennessee.

Refrigerator Bowl

The Refrigerator Bowl in Evansville, Indiana featured the Ohio Valley Conference champion Middle Tennessee State against the undefeated Lone Star Conference champion Sam Houston State.

Tangerine Bowl

The 1957 Tangerine Bowl featured College Division Independent Mississippi Southern (later known as Southern Miss) against the West Texas State Buffaloes from the University-division Border Conference.

Undefeated teams
Other schools that finished their seasons unbeaten and untied were Lenoir Rhyne College, New Haven Teachers College, Hillsdale College, Central Michigan University, Kearney State College, Redlands College, Westminster College (Pennsylvania), St. Thomas (Minn.) College, Alfred University and Milton College (Wisconsin).

See also
 1956 NCAA University Division football season
 1956 NAIA football season

References